David O'Hare (born 1 June 1990) is a retired professional Irish tennis player who played mainly on the ATP Challenger Tour. On 24 August 2015 he reached his highest ATP singles ranking of 1438 and on 3 April 2017 reached his highest doubles ranking of 117. O’Hare still plays for the Irish Davis Cup team. He is the coach of the No. 1 doubles pairing Rajeev Ram and Joe Salisbury, leading them to two masters titles and retention of their US Open title in 2022.

Career finals

Doubles: 29 (18–11)

External links 
 
 

1990 births
Living people
Irish male tennis players
Memphis Tigers men's tennis players